V-by-One US is an electrical digital signaling standard developed by THine Electronics. It succeeds V-by-One HS, offers four times the data rate per signaling lane and is used as internal interface of digital pixel displays.

History 
THine announced the development of the transmission lines for V-by-One US on June 5, 2017. The new specification allows data rates up to 16 Gbit/s per lane, which is 4 times faster than the 4 Gbit/s of V-by-One HS. It enables 4K 60 Hz displays over 2 lanes and 8K 60 Hz displays over 8 lanes.

On September 21, 2018, the company announced it had working samples of the V-by-One US chipset ready. The chipset supports two 16 Gbit/s signalling lanes, which enables a 4K display or four 1080p displays at 60 Hz. The chipset is able to data between 8-lane V-by-One HS and 2-lane V-by-One US.

August 13, 2020, Silicon Creations announced that its Deserializer PMA was used as a V-by-One HS receiver in a 12nm SoC aimed at 8K TV's designed by Novatek Microelectronics.

Comparison

References

Digital signal processing